The African bush elephant (Loxodonta africana), also known as the African savanna elephant, is one of two extant African elephant species and one of three extant elephant species.

It is distributed across 37 African countries and inhabits forests, grasslands and woodlands, wetlands and agricultural land. Since 2021, it has been listed as Endangered on the IUCN Red List. It is threatened foremost by habitat destruction, and in parts of its range also by poaching for meat and ivory.

It is a social mammal, travelling in herds composed of cows and their offspring. Adult bulls usually live alone or in small bachelor groups. It is a herbivore, feeding on grasses, creepers, herbs, leaves, and bark.
The menstrual cycle lasts three to four months, and females are pregnant for 22 months, the longest gestation period of any mammal.

Taxonomy 
Elephas africanus was the scientific name proposed by Johann Friedrich Blumenbach in 1797. 
Loxodonte was proposed as generic name for African elephants by Frédéric Cuvier in 1825. This name refers to the lozenge-shaped enamel of the molar teeth, which differs significantly from the shape of the Asian elephant's molar enamel.

In the 19th and 20th centuries, several zoological specimens were described by naturalists and curators of natural history museums from various parts of Africa, including:
Elephas (Loxodonta) oxyotis and Elephas (Loxodonta) knochenhaueri by Paul Matschie in 1900. The first was a specimen from the upper Atbara River in northern Ethiopia, and the second a specimen from the Kilwa area in Tanzania.
Elephas africanus toxotis, selousi, peeli,  cavendishi, orleansi and rothschildi by Richard Lydekker in 1907 who assumed that ear size is a distinguishing character for a race. These specimens were shot in South Africa, Mashonaland in Zimbabwe, Aberdare Mountains and Lake Turkana area in Kenya, Somaliland, and western Sudan, respectively.
North African elephant (L. a. pharaohensis) by Paulus Edward Pieris Deraniyagala in 1948 was a specimen from Fayum in Egypt.
Today, these names are all considered synonyms.

Phylogeny 

A genetic study based on mitogenomic analysis revealed that the African and Asian elephant genetically diverged about 7.6 million years ago.
Phylogenetic analysis of nuclear DNA of African bush and forest elephants, Asian elephant, woolly mammoth, and American mastodon revealed that the African bush elephant and the African forest elephant form a sister group that genetically diverged at least 1.9 million years ago. They are therefore considered distinct species. Gene flow between the two species, however, might have occurred after the split.

Characteristics

Skin and ears 

The African bush elephant has grey skin with scanty hairs.
Large ears help to reduce body heat; flapping them creates air currents and exposes large blood vessels on the inner sides to increase heat loss during hot weather. The African bush elephant's ears are pointed and triangular shaped. Its occipital plane slopes forward. Its back is shaped markedly concave. Its sturdy tusks are curved out and point forward.

Size 

Elephants attain their maximum stature when they complete the fusion of long-bone epiphyses, occurring in males around the age of 40 and females around the age of 25.

Trunk 
The trunk is a prehensile elongation of the upper lip and nose. Short tactile hair grows on the trunk, which has two finger-like processes on the tip.
This highly sensitive organ is innervated primarily by the trigeminal nerve, and is thought to be manipulated by about 40,000–60,000 muscles. Because of this muscular structure, the trunk is so strong that elephants can use it for lifting about 3% of their own body weight. They use it for smelling, touching, feeding, drinking, dusting, sound production, loading, defending, and attacking.
Functional loss of the trunk due to floppy trunk syndrome sometimes forces elephants to carry their trunks over their tusks and walk into deep water to drink. A 2021 study found that African elephants can also use their trunks to suction up food and are capable of inhaling "at speeds exceeding 490 feet per second, or almost 30 times as fast as humans can sneeze."

Tusks 

Both sexes have tusks, which erupt when they are 1–3 years old and grow throughout life. Tusks grow from deciduous teeth known as tushes that develop in the upper jaw and consist of a crown, root and pulpal cavity, which are completely formed soon after birth.
They are composed of dentin and coated with a thin layer of cementum. Their tips bear a conical layer of enamel that is usually worn off when the elephant is five years old.
Tusks of bulls grow faster than tusks of cows.

Molars 

It develops six molars in each jaw quadrant that erupt at different ages and differ in size. The dental alveoli of the fifth molars are visible by the age of 10–11 years. The dental alveoli of the last molars are visible by the age of 26–28 years.

Distribution and habitat 
The African bush elephant occurs in Sub-Saharan Africa including Uganda, Kenya, Tanzania, Botswana, Zimbabwe, Namibia, Zambia, and Angola. It moves between a variety of habitats, including subtropical and temperate forests, dry and seasonally flooded grasslands, woodlands, wetlands, and agricultural land from sea level to mountain slopes. In Mali and Namibia, it also inhabits desert and semi-desert areas.

By the late 1970s, the population had declined to a herd in the Dawa River valley and one close to the Kenyan border.

Behavior and ecology

Social behavior 

The core of elephant society is the family unit, which comprises several adult cows, their daughters, and their prepubertal sons. Iain Douglas-Hamilton, who observed African bush elephants for 4.5 years in Lake Manyara National Park, coined the term 'kinship group' for two or more family units that have close ties. The family unit is led by a matriarch who at times also leads the kinship group. Groups cooperate in locating food and water, in self-defense, and in caring for offspring (termed allomothering). Group size varies seasonally and between locations. In Tsavo East and Tsavo West National Parks, groups are bigger in the rainy season and areas with open vegetation.
Aerial surveys in the late 1960s to early 1970s revealed an average group size of 6.3 individuals in Uganda's Rwenzori National Park and 28.8 individuals in Chambura Game Reserve. In both sites, elephants aggregated during the wet season, whereas groups were smaller in the dry season.
 

Young bulls gradually separate from the family unit when they are between 10 and 19 years old. They range alone for some time or form all-male groups. A 2020 study highlighted the importance of old bulls for the navigation and survival of herds and raised concerns over the removal of old bulls as "currently occur[ring] in both legal trophy hunting and illegal poaching".

Temperature regulation 
It was first hypothesized that African bush elephants sustain the intense savanna heat by performing heterothermy or matching their internal temperature with the environment. Instead, African bush elephants have curved skin that generates bending cracks, which support thermoregulation by water retention. These bending cracks also contribute to an evaporative cooling process which causes elephants to maintain their body temperature regardless of air temperature via homeothermy.

Diet 
The African bush elephant is herbivorous. Its diet consists mainly of grasses, creepers, and herbs. During the dry season, the diet also includes leaves and bark. Tree bark in particular contains high levels of calcium. Elephants in captivity may consume leaves and fruit of cherimoya, papaya, banana, guava and leaves, stems and seeds of maize, sorghum and sugarcane.
To supplement their diet with minerals, they congregate at mineral-rich water holes, termite mounds, and mineral licks. Salt licks visited by elephants in the Kalahari contain high concentrations of water-soluble sodium. Elephants drink  of water daily, and seem to prefer sites where water and soil contain sodium. In Kruger National Park and on the shore of Lake Kariba, elephants were observed to ingest wood ash, which also contains sodium.

Communication
Africa bush elephants use their trunks for tactile communication. When greeting, a lower ranking individual will insert the tip of its trunk into its superior's mouth. Elephants will also stretch out their trunk toward an approaching individual they intend to greet. Mother elephants reassure their young with touches, embraces, and rubbings with the foot while slapping disciplines them. During courtship, a couple will caress and intertwine with their trunks while playing and fighting individuals wrestle with them.

Elephant vocals are variations of rumbles, trumpets, squeals, and screams. Rumbles are mainly produced for long-distance communication and cover a broad range of frequencies which are mostly below what a human can hear. Infrasonic rumbles can travel vast distances and are important for attracting mates and scaring off rivals. 

At Amboseli National Park several different infrasonic calls have been identified:
Greeting rumble – is emitted by adult female members of a family group that have united after having been separated for several hours.
Contact call – soft, unmodulated sounds made by an individual that has been separated from the group.
Contact answer – made in response to the contact call; starts out loud, but softens toward the end.
"Let's go" rumble – a soft rumble emitted by the matriarch to signal to the other herd members that it is time to move to another spot.
Musth rumble – distinctive, low-frequency pulsated rumble emitted by musth males (nicknamed the "motorcycle").
Female chorus – a low-frequency, modulated chorus produced by several cows in response to a musth rumble.
Postcopulatory call – made by an oestrous cow after mating.
Mating pandemonium – calls of excitement made by a cow's family after she has mated.

Growls are audible rumbles and happen during greetings. When in pain or fear, an elephant makes an open-mouthed growl known as a bellow while a drawn-out growl is a moan. Growling can escalate into a roaring when the elephant is issuing a threat. Trumpeting is made by blowing through the trunk and signals excitement, distress, or aggression. Juvenile elephants squeal in distress while screaming is made by adults for intimidation.

Musth 
Bulls in musth experience swelling of the temporal glands and secretion of fluid, the musth fluid, which flows down their cheeks. They begin to dribble urine, initially as discrete drops and later in a regular stream. These manifestations of musth last from a few days to months, depending on the age and condition of the bull. When a bull has been urinating for a long time, the proximal part of the penis and the distal end of the sheath show a greenish coloration, termed the 'green penis syndrome' by Joyce Poole and Cynthia Moss. Males in musth become more aggressive. They guard and mate with females in estrus, who stay closer to bulls in musth than to non-musth bulls. Urinary testosterone increases during musth. Bulls begin to experience musth by the age of 24 years. Periods of musth are short and sporadic in young bulls up to 35 years old, lasting a few days to weeks. Older bulls are in musth for 2–5 months every year. Musth occurs mainly during and following the rainy season when females are in estrus. Bulls in musth often chase each other and are aggressive towards other bulls in musth. When old and high-ranking bulls in musth threaten and chase young musth bulls, either the latter leave the group or their musth ceases.

Young bulls in musth killed about 50 white rhinoceros in Pilanesberg National Park between 1992 and 1997. This unusual behavior was attributed to their young age and inadequate socialisation; they were 17–25-year-old orphans from culled families that grew up without the guidance of dominant bulls. When six adult bulls were introduced into the park, the young bulls did not attack rhinos anymore, indicating older bulls suppress the musth and aggressiveness of younger bulls. Similar incidents were recorded in Hluhluwe-Umfolozi Park, where young bulls killed five black and 58 white rhinoceros between 1991 and 2001. After the introduction of ten bulls, each up to 45 years old, the number of rhinos killed by elephants decreased considerably.

Reproduction 

Spermatogenesis starts when bulls are about 15 years old.
Cows ovulate for the first time at the age of 11 years. They are in estrus for 2–6 days.
In captivity, cows have an oestrous cycle lasting 14–15 weeks. Foetal gonads enlarge during the second half of pregnancy.

African bush elephants mate during the rainy season. Bulls in musth cover long distances in search of cows and associate with large family units. They listen for the cows' loud, very low frequency calls and attract cows by calling and by leaving trails of strong-smelling urine. Cows search for bulls in musth, listen for their calls, and follow their urine trails.
Bulls in musth are more successful at obtaining mating opportunities than those who are not. A cow may move away from bulls that attempt to test her estrous condition. If pursued by several bulls, she will run away. Once she chooses a mating partner, she will stay away from other bulls, which are threatened and chased away by the favoured bull. Competition between bulls overrides their choice sometimes.

Gestation lasts 22 months. The interval between births was estimated at 3.9 to 4.7 years in Hwange National Park. Where hunting pressure on adult elephants was high in the 1970s, cows gave birth once in 2.9 to 3.8 years. Cows in Amboseli National Park gave birth once in 5 years on average.

The birth of a calf was observed in Tsavo East National Park in October 1990. A group of 80 elephants including eight bulls had gathered in the morning in a  radius around the birth site. A small group of calves and cows stood near the pregnant cow, rumbling and flapping their ears. One cow seemed to assist her. While she was in labour, fluid streamed from her temporal and ear canals. She remained standing while giving birth. The newborn calf struggled to its feet within 30 minutes and walked 20 minutes later. The mother expelled the placenta about 100 minutes after birth and covered it with soil immediately.

Cows lactate for about 4.8 years. 
Calves exclusively suckle their mother's milk during the first three months. Thereafter, they start feeding independently and slowly increase the time spent feeding until they are two years old. During the first three years, male calves spend more time suckling and grow faster than female calves. After this period, cows reject male calves more frequently from nursing than female calves.

The maximum lifespan of the African bush elephant is between 70 and 75 years. Its generation length is 25 years.

Predators 
Adult elephants are considered invulnerable to predation. Calves, usually under two years, are sometimes preyed on by lions and spotted hyenas. Adult elephants often chase off predators, especially lions, by mobbing behavior. Juveniles are usually well defended by protective adults though serious drought makes them vulnerable to lion predation.

In Botswana's Chobe National Park, lions attacked and fed on juvenile and subadult elephants during the drought when smaller prey species were scarce. Between 1993 and 1996, lions successfully attacked 74 elephants; 26 were older than nine, and one was a bull of over 15 years. Most were killed at night, and hunts occurred more often during waning moon nights than during bright moon nights. In the same park, lions killed eight elephants in October 2005 that were aged between 1 and 11 years, two of them older than 8 years. Successful hunts took place after dark when prides exceeded 27 lions and herds were smaller than 5 elephants.

Threats 
The African bush elephant is threatened primarily by habitat loss and fragmentation following conversion of natural habitat for livestock farming, plantations of non-timber crops, and building of urban and industrial areas. As a result, the human-elephant conflict has increased.

Poaching 
Poachers target foremost elephant bulls for their tusks, which leads to a skewed sex ratio and affects the survival chances of a population. Access of poachers to unregulated black markets is facilitated by corruption and periods of civil war in some elephant range countries.

During the 20th century, the African bush elephant population was decimated. Poaching of the elephant has dated back to the years 1970 and 1980, which were considered the largest killings in history. Unfortunately, the species is placed in harm's way due to the limited conservation areas provided in Africa. In most cases, the killings of the African bush elephant have occurred near the outskirts of the protected areas.

Between 2003 and 2015, the illegal killing of 14,606 African bush elephants was reported by rangers across 29 range countries. Chad is a major transit country for smuggling of ivory in West Africa. This trend was curtailed by raising penalties for poaching and improving law enforcement.

In June 2002, a container packed with more than  ivory was confiscated in Singapore. It contained 42,120 hanko stamps and 532 tusks of African bush elephants that originated in Southern Africa, centered in Zambia and neighboring countries. Between 2005 and 2006, a total of  ivory plus 91 unweighed tusks of African bush elephants were confiscated in 12 major consignments being shipped to Asia.

When the international ivory trade reopened in 2006, the demand and price for ivory increased in Asia. The African bush elephant population in Chad's Zakouma National Park numbered 3,900 individuals in 2005. Within five years, more than 3,200 elephants were killed. The park did not have sufficient guards to combat poaching, and their weapons were outdated. Well-organized networks facilitated smuggling the ivory through Sudan.
Poaching also increased in Kenya in those years.
In Samburu National Reserve, 41 bulls were illegally killed between 2008 and 2012, equivalent to 31% of the reserve's elephant population.

These killings were linked to confiscations of ivory and increased prices for ivory on the local black market.
About 10,370 tusks were confiscated in Singapore, Hong Kong, Taiwan, Philippines, Thailand, Malaysia, Kenya and Uganda between 2007 and 2013. Genetic analysis of tusk samples showed that they originated from African bush elephants killed in Tanzania, Mozambique, Zambia, Kenya, and Uganda. Most of the ivory was smuggled through East African countries.

In addition to elephants being poached, their carcasses may be poisoned by the poachers to avoid detection by vultures, which help rangers detect poaching activity by circling dead animals. This poses a threat to those vultures or birds that scavenge the carcasses. On 20 June 2019, the carcasses of two tawny eagles and 537 endangered Old World vultures including 468 white-backed vultures, 17 white-headed vultures, 28 hooded vultures, 14 lappet-faced vultures and 10 Cape vultures found dead in northern Botswana were suspected to have died after eating the poisoned carcasses of three elephants.

Intensive poaching leads to strong selection on tusk attributes; African elephants in areas with heavy poaching often have smaller tusks and a higher frequency of congenitally tuskless females, whereas congenital tusklessness is rarely if ever observed in males. A study in Mozambique's Gorongosa National Park revealed that poaching during the Mozambican Civil War lead to the increasing birth of tuskless females when the population recovered.

Habitat changes 
Vast areas in Sub-Saharan Africa were transformed for agricultural use and the building of infrastructure. This disturbance leaves the elephants without a stable habitat and limits their ability to roam freely. Large corporations associated with commercial logging and mining have fragmented the land, giving poachers easy access to the African bush elephant. As human development grows, the human population faces the trouble of contact with the elephants more frequently, due to the species need for food and water. Farmers residing in nearby areas come into conflict with the African bush elephants rummaging through their crops. In many cases, they kill the elephants as soon as they disturb a village or forage upon its crops. Deaths caused by browsing on rubber vine, an invasive alien plant, have also been reported.

Pathogens 
Observations at Etosha National Park indicate that African bush elephants die due to anthrax foremost in November at the end of the dry season. Anthrax spores spread through the intestinal tracts of vultures, jackals and hyaenas that feed on the carcasses. Anthrax killed over 100 elephants in Botswana in 2019.

It is thought that wild bush elephants can contract fatal tuberculosis from humans. Infection of the vital organs by Citrobacter freundii bacteria caused the death of an otherwise healthy bush elephant after capture and translocation.

From April to June 2020, over 400 bush elephants died in Botswana's Okavango Delta region after drinking from desiccating waterholes that were infested with cyanobacteria. Neurotoxins produced by the cyanobacteria caused calves and adult elephants to wander around confused, emaciated and in distress. The elephants collapsed when the toxin impaired their motor functions and their legs became paralysed. Poaching, intentional poisoning, and anthrax were excluded as potential causes.

Conservation 

Both African elephant species have been listed on Appendix I of the Convention on International Trade in Endangered Species of Wild Fauna and Flora since 1989. In 1997, populations of Botswana, Namibia, and Zimbabwe were placed on CITES Appendix II, as were populations of South Africa in 2000. Community-based conservation programmes have been initiated in several range countries, which contributed to reducing human-elephant conflict and increasing local people's tolerance towards elephants.

In 1986, the African Elephant Database was initiated to collate and update information on the distribution and status of elephant populations in Africa. The database includes results from aerial surveys, dung counts, interviews with local people, and data on poaching.

Researchers discovered that playing back the recorded sounds of African bees is an effective method to drive elephants away from settlements.

Status 
In 1996, IUCN Red List assessors for the African bush elephant considered the species Endangered. Since 2021, it has been assessed Endangered, after the global population was found to have decreased by more than 50% over 3 generations. About 70% of its range is located outside protected areas.

In captivity 
The social behavior of elephants in captivity mimics that of those in the wild. Cows are kept with other cows, in groups, while bulls tend to be separated from their mothers at a young age and are kept apart. According to Schulte, in the 1990s, in North America, a few facilities allowed bull interaction. Elsewhere, bulls were only allowed to smell each other. Bulls and cows were allowed to interact for specific purposes such as breeding. In that event, cows were more often moved to the bull than the bull to the cow. Cows are more often kept in captivity because they are easier and less expensive to house.

See also 

 2006 Zakouma elephant slaughter
 Dwarf elephant
 Elephant cognition
 Knysna elephants
 List of individual elephants 
 Pygmy elephant

Notes

References

Further reading

External links 

 Elephant Information Repository – An in-depth resource on elephants

 ARKive – images and movies of the African Bush Elephant (Loxodonta africana)
 BBC Wildlife Finder – Clips from the BBC archive, news stories and sound files of the African Bush Elephant
 View the elephant genome on Ensembl
 People Not Poaching: The Communities and IWT Learning Platform

African bush elephant
Mammals of Sub-Saharan Africa
Afrotropical realm fauna
Species endangered by habitat fragmentation
Herbivorous mammals
Endangered animals
Endangered biota of Africa
African bush elephant
African bush elephant